Jerri Ariel Farias Hahn (born 12 June 1982), simply known as Jerri, is a Brazilian footballer who plays as a midfielder.

Honours
Jabaquara
Campeonato Paulista Série B3: 2002

References

External links
UAE Football Association profile
Acervo Santista profile 

1982 births
Living people
Sportspeople from Rio Grande do Sul
Brazilian footballers
Brazilian people of German descent
Association football midfielders
Campeonato Brasileiro Série A players
Santos FC players
Goiás Esporte Clube players
Al Nassr FC players
Hatta Club players
Khor Fakkan Sports Club players
Ajman Club players
Al-Shaab CSC players
Thai League 1 players
Chiangrai United F.C. players
Brazilian expatriate footballers
Brazilian expatriate sportspeople in Saudi Arabia
Expatriate footballers in Saudi Arabia
Brazilian expatriate sportspeople in the United Arab Emirates
Expatriate footballers in the United Arab Emirates
Brazilian expatriate sportspeople in Thailand
Expatriate footballers in Thailand
UAE First Division League players
UAE Pro League players
Saudi Professional League players